The Police and Border Guard Aviation Group is a mixed helicopter and airplane flight unit formerly operating under the Estonian Border Guard, but now subordinate to the Police and Border Guard Board. The squadron is a rapid response search and rescue unit, which also conducts medical transport and border patrol operations.

History

The creation of the unit began with the establishment of the Border Guard Flight Department in 1992. The unit was officially established on 8 February 1993, under the name of National Border Guard Squadron and the unit started operating from Tallinn Airport. Arvo Palumäe became the commander of the squadron. The squadron initially operated two Let L-410 airplanes, donated by Germany in 1992 and received on 23 February 1993. The airplanes started participating in HELCOM flights that same year. On 1 September 1994, based on the squadron, the Estonian National Aviation Group was established. The unit participated in the rescue efforts of the MS Estonia disaster. As a result of that tragedy, a helicopter squadron was quickly established during that same year. German Air Rescue donated four former Air Forces of the National People's Army's Mil Mi-8 helicopters for the squadron (a fifth one was sent for spare parts), which were officially handed over on 7 December 1995. On 22 April 1997, the unit was subordinated to the Estonian Border Guard again and renamed the Border Guard Aviation Group. In 1999, Allan Oksmann became the commander of the unit. Between 2007 and 2011, the unit received new AW139 utility helicopters to replace aging Mil Mi-8 helicopters. The unit participated in a Frontex mission called "Poseidon 2009" with one maritime patrol aircraft. In 2010, the unit was transferred to the newly established Police and Border Guard Board and made subordinate to the Border Guard Board. The unit has been under the command of Kalmer Sütt since at least 2012. A new complex of the Border Guard Board was opened at the Kuressaare Airport in 2013. The unit transferred under the Intelligence Management and Investigation Department during a restructuring of the Police and Border Guard Board in 2014. In 2020, the aviation group was moved under the Border Guard Department.

Equipment

Current equipment

Former equipment

References

External links

Aviation in Estonia